Strykersville is a hamlet (and census-designated place) located within the town of Sheldon, with a small southern portion in the Town of Java, in the western part of Wyoming County, New York, United States. The population was 647 people in the 2010 census. It is located on New York State Route 78.

Notable people

 Edward Gaylord Bourne, historian who was born in Strykersville
 Jim Konstanty, former MLB pitcher and NL MVP who was born in Strykersville

References

External links 
 USA.com
	

1867 establishments in New York (state)
Census-designated places in New York (state)
Hamlets in New York (state)
Populated places established in 1867
Census-designated places in Wyoming County, New York
Hamlets in Wyoming County, New York